is the 7th single by Nogizaka46. It was released on November 27, 2013. It debuted in number one on the weekly Oricon Singles Chart. It was the 14th best-selling single of the year in Japan. It has sold a total of 515,965 copies, as of July 28, 2014 (chart date). It reached number one on the Billboard Japan Hot 100. A song from the single, was the second opening theme of season 15 of the Naruto: Shippuden anime television series.

Release 
This single was released in 4 versions. Type-A, Type-B, Type-C and a regular edition. The center position in the choreography for the title song is held by Miona Hori who is a member of 2nd generation.

Track listing

Type-A

Type-B

Type-C

Regular Edition

Anime Edition

Participating members

Barrette

3rd Row: Marika Itō, Misa Etō, Asuka Saitō, Manatsu Akimoto, Mai Fukagawa, Himeka Nakamoto, Hina Kawago, Kazumi Takayama

2nd Row: Reika Sakurai, Erika Ikuta, Rina Ikoma, Yumi Wakatsuki 

1st Row: Nanase Nishino, Mai Shiraishi, Miona Hori , Nanami Hashimoto, Sayuri Matsumura

Chart and certifications

Weekly charts

Year-end charts

Certifications

References

Further reading

External links
 Discography  on Nogizaka46 Official Website 
 
 Nogizaka46 Movie Digest on YouTube

2013 singles
2013 songs
Japanese-language songs
Nogizaka46 songs
Oricon Weekly number-one singles
Billboard Japan Hot 100 number-one singles
Songs with lyrics by Yasushi Akimoto